Dangers of a Bride is a 1917 American silent comedy film directed by Clarence G. Badger and starring Gloria Swanson.

Cast
 Gloria Swanson
 Bobby Vernon
 Agnes Vernon
 Fritz Schade
 Juanita Hansen
 Jay Dwiggins
 Robert Milliken
 Al McKinnon
 Martha Trick
 F.B. Cooper

References

External links

1917 films
American silent short films
American black-and-white films
1917 comedy films
1917 short films
Films directed by Clarence G. Badger
Films directed by Robert P. Kerr
Keystone Studios films
Films produced by Mack Sennett
Silent American comedy films
American comedy short films
1910s American films